The 2023 Abia State House of Assembly election will take place on 11 March 2023, to elect members of the Abia State House of Assembly. The election will be held concurrent with the state gubernatorial election as well as twenty-seven other gubernatorial elections and elections to all other state houses of assembly. It will be held two weeks after the presidential election and National Assembly elections.

Electoral system
The members of state Houses of Assembly are elected using first-past-the-post voting in single-member constituencies.

Background
In the previous House of Assembly elections, the PDP won a sizeable majority that elected Chinedum Enyinnaya Orji (PDP-Umuahia Central) as Speaker. In other Abia elections, incumbent PDP Governor Okezie Ikpeazu won in a landslide but federal elections were closer as the PDP lost ground by only winning seven House of Representatives seats and two Senate seats compared to all nine House seats and all three Senate seats in 2015. For the presidency, Abia was easily won by PDP nominee Atiku Abubakar with about 68% but still swung towards the APC and had strikingly low turnout.

During the term, a number of defections shifting the main opposition position from APGA to the APC with Chijioke Chukwu (APC-Bende North) becoming Minority Leader in June 2021. Other key events included corruption investigations into Orji and his brief arrest by the EFCC, the formal reprimand of Chukwu for his criticism of Ikpeazu, a court judgement barring MHA Obinna Ichita (APGA-Aba South) from "defamatory statements", an aborted attempt to impeach the Deputy Speaker and Majority Leader, and the resignation of Majority Chief Whip Munachim Alozie (Ugwunagbo) to join the Labour Party.

Overview

Summary

Notes

See also 
 2023 Nigerian elections
 2023 Nigerian House of Assembly elections

References 

House of Assembly
2023
Abia
March 2023 events in Nigeria